The 2014–15 Winnipeg Jets season was the 16th season for the National Hockey League franchise that was established on June 25, 1997, and the fourth in Winnipeg since the franchise relocated from Atlanta following the conclusion of the 2010–11 season.

Regular season 
On April 9, 2015, the Jets qualified for the 2015 Stanley Cup playoffs, marking the return of playoff hockey to Winnipeg for the first time since the 1996 Stanley Cup playoffs.  The Jets would set a franchise record, with 99 points, finishing with a 43-26-13 record.

Playoffs

The Winnipeg Jets entered the playoffs as the Western Conference's second wild card. The Jets faced the Ducks in the opening round, but were swept in four straight games. In the first three games, the Jets had leads going into the third period, but couldn't hold them. Overall in the series, the Ducks outscored the Jets 16-9. The Ducks outscored the Jets 10-1, after the 2nd intermission.

Standings

Schedule and results

Pre-season

Regular season

Playoffs

Player statistics
Final Stats

Skaters

Goaltenders

†Denotes player spent time with another team before joining the Jets.  Stats reflect time with the Jets only.
‡Traded mid-season. Stats reflect time with the Jets only.
Bold/italics denotes franchise record

Notable achievements

Awards

Milestones

Transactions 
Winnipeg has been involved in the following transactions during the 2014–15 season.

Trades

Free agents acquired

Free agents lost

Claimed via waivers

Lost via waivers

Lost via retirement

Player signings

Suspensions/fines

Draft picks

The 2014 NHL Entry Draft will be held on June 27–28, 2014 at the Wells Fargo Center in Philadelphia, Pennsylvania.

Draft notes
Winnipeg's second-round pick will go to the Buffalo Sabres, as the result of a trade on March 5, 2014 that sent Matt Moulson and Cody McCormick to Minnesota, in exchange for Torrey Mitchell, a second-round pick in 2016 and this pick.
New Jersey's fourth-round pick will go to Winnipeg, as the result of a trade on February 13, 2013 that sent Alexei Ponikarovsky to New Jersey, in exchange for a seventh-round pick in 2013, and this pick.
Winnipeg's' sixth-round pick went to the Washington Capitals as the result of a trade on June 28, 2014 that sent a sixth-round pick in 2014 (164th overall), Nashville's seventh-round pick in 2014 (192nd overall) and a seventh-round pick in 2015 to Winnipeg in exchange for Edward Pasquale and this pick.
Winnipeg's seventh-round (189th overall) pick went to the Ottawa Senators, on June 28, 2014 in exchange for a sixth-round pick in 2015.

References

Winnipeg Jets seasons
Winnipeg
Winnipeg
Winnipeg Jets
Winnipeg Jets